Autocracy is a system of government in which absolute power over a state is concentrated in the hands of one person, whose decisions are subject neither to external legal restraints nor to regularized mechanisms of popular control (except perhaps for the implicit threat of a coup d'état or other forms of rebellion).

In earlier times, the term autocrat was coined as a favorable description of a ruler, having some connection to the concept of "lack of conflicts of interests" as well as an indication of grandeur and power. This use of the term continued into modern times, as the Russian emperor was styled "Autocrat of all the Russias" as late as the early 20th century. In the 19th century, Eastern and Central Europe were under autocratic monarchies within the territories of which lived diverse peoples.

Autocracy is the most common and durable regime type since the emergence of the state.

History and etymology
Autocracy comes from the Ancient Greek autos (Greek: αὐτός; "self") and kratos (Greek: κράτος; "power", "strength") from Kratos, the Greek personification of authority. In Medieval Greek, the term Autocrates was used for anyone holding the title emperor, regardless of the actual power of the monarch. The term was used in Ancient Greece and Rome with varying meanings. In the Middle Ages, the Byzantine Emperor was styled Autocrat of the Romans. Some historical Slavic monarchs such as Russian tsars and emperors, due to Byzantine influence, included the title Autocrat as part of their official styles, distinguishing them from the constitutional monarchs elsewhere in Europe.

Comparison with other forms of government
Both totalitarian and military dictatorship are often identified with, but need not be, an autocracy. Totalitarianism is a system where the state strives to control every aspect of life and civil society. It can be headed by a supreme leader, making it autocratic, but it can also have a collective leadership such as a presidium, military junta, or a single political party as in the case of a one-party state.

Origin and developments
Examples from early modern Europe suggests early statehood was favorable for democracy. According to Jacob Hariri, outside Europe, history shows that early statehood has led to autocracy. The reasons he gives are continuation of the original autocratic rule and absence of "institutional transplantation" or European settlement. This may be because of the country's capacity to fight colonization, or the presence of state infrastructure that Europeans did not need for the creation of new institutions to rule. In all the cases, representative institutions were unable to get introduced in these countries and they sustained their autocratic rule. European colonization was varied and conditional on many factors. Countries which were rich in natural resources had an extractive[?] and indirect rule whereas other colonies saw European settlement. Because of this settlement, these countries possibly experienced setting up of new institutions. Colonization also depended on factor endowments and settler mortality.

Mancur Olson theorizes the development of autocracies as the first transition from anarchy to state. For Olson, anarchy is characterized by a number of "roving bandits" who travel around many different geographic areas extorting wealth from local populations leaving little incentive for populations to invest and produce. As local populations lose the incentive to produce, there is little wealth for either the bandits to steal or the people to use. Olson theorizes autocrats as "stationary bandits" who solve this dilemma by establishing control over a small fiefdom and monopolize the extortion of wealth in the fiefdom in the form of taxes. Once an autocracy is developed, Olson theorizes that both the autocrat and the local population will be better off as the autocrat will have an "encompassing interest" in the maintenance and growth of wealth in the fiefdom. Because violence threatens the creation of rents, the "stationary bandit" has incentives to monopolize violence and to create a peaceful order. Peter Kurrild-Klitgaard and G.T. Svendsen have argued that the Viking expansion and settlements in the 9th-11th centuries may be interpreted as an example of roving bandits becoming stationary.

Douglass North, John Joseph Wallis, and Barry R. Weingast describe autocracies as limited access orders that arise from this need to monopolize violence. In contrast to Olson, these scholars understand the early state not as a single ruler, but as an organization formed by many actors. They describe the process of autocratic state formation as a bargaining process among individuals with access to violence. For them, these individuals form a dominant coalition that grants each other privileges such as the access to resources. As violence reduces the rents, members of the dominant coalition have incentives to cooperate and to avoid fighting. A limited access to privileges is necessary to avoid competition among the members of the dominant coalition, who then will credibly commit to cooperate and will form the state.

Closed vs Elected Autocracy 
There are several significant distinctions between closed and elected autocracies, both of which are authoritarian types of governance in which one person or group has total authority.

A closed autocracy is a form of governance whereby all parties except for one official party are prohibited, although political independents who are not overtly anti-regime may occasionally be elected - this elite group faces no accountability from the population, as the population receives no civil liberties. These people may acquire their positions of authority by inheritance, a coup, or other illegitimate methods, with no “choice” over their leader. According to the 2022 V-Dem Democracy Report, there is a growing number of closed autocracies (30 countries as of 2020), that account for 26% of the global population. In order to move a country towards liberal democracy in a closed autocracy, there needs to be an initial semi-liberal autocratic transition phase (unless they become occupied by foreign powers during a war who are willing to democratize).

On the other hand, an elected autocracy is a form of government in which the autocrat gains control through a democratic procedure, such as an election. Once in charge, an autocrat will, however, use their position to expand their authority, restrict the impact of other political figures, and attack democratic institutions like the court and the free press, manipulating contestation to make turnover unlikely or impossible. Although there may be some appearance of democracy under an elected autocracy, in reality the autocrat controls most of the authority and the public has little opportunity to hold them accountable, as with a closed autocracy. This is also referred to as a “hybrid regime that leans more towards the autocratic side”. Elected autocracies are still considered to be the most common government structure globally - 44% of the world’s population live under this regime. In order to move towards liberal democracy in an elected autocracy, the remaining barriers of illegitimacy and unfairness must be gradually removed.

Maintenance
Because autocrats need a power structure to rule, it can be difficult to draw a clear line between historical autocracies and oligarchies. Most historical autocrats depended on their nobles, their merchants, the military, the priesthood, or other elite groups. Some autocracies are rationalized by assertion of divine right; historically this has mainly been reserved for medieval kingdoms. In recent years researchers have found significant connections between the types of rules governing succession in monarchies and autocracies and the frequency with which coups or succession crises occur.

According to Douglass North, John Joseph Wallis, and Barry R. Weingast, in limited access orders the state is ruled by a dominant coalition formed by a small elite group that relates to each other by personal relationships. To remain in power, this elite hinders people outside the dominant coalition to access organizations and resources. Autocracy is maintained as long as the personal relationships of the elite continue to forge the dominant coalition. These scholars further suggest that once the dominant coalition starts to become broader and allow for impersonal relationships, limited access orders can give place to open access orders.

For Daron Acemoglu, Simon Johnson, and James Robinson, the allocation of political power explains the maintenance of autocracies which they usually refer to as "extractive states". For them, the de jure political power comes from political institutions, whereas the de facto political power is determined by the distribution of resources. Those holding the political power in the present will design the political and economic institutions in the future according to their interests. In autocracies, both de jure and de facto political powers are concentrated in one person or a small elite that will promote institutions for keeping the de jure political power as concentrated as the de facto political power, thereby maintaining autocratic regimes with extractive institutions.

Yu-Ming Liou and Paul Musgrave have found evidence that resource-rich autocracies often times apply antisocial policies in order to harm targeted groups (for example, restricting women's autonomy, especially in Middle Eastern autocracies) as a form of strategy to stay in power.

Autocracy promotion
It has been argued that authoritarian regimes such as China and Russia and totalitarian states such as North Korea have attempted to export their system of government to other countries through "autocracy promotion". A number of scholars are skeptical that China and Russia have successfully exported authoritarianism abroad.

Historical examples

 The Roman Empire, which Augustus founded following the end of the Roman Republic in 27 BC. Augustus officially kept the Roman Senate while effectively consolidating all of the real power in himself. Rome was generally peaceful and prosperous until the imperial rule of Commodus starting in 180 AD. The crisis of the Third Century saw the barbarian invasions and insurrections by prominent generals as well as economic decline. Both Diocletian and Maximian ruled as autocratic leaders, strengthening the control of the emperor in a phase known as Dominate. The empire was extremely large, difficult to govern by a single emperor, and was ruled by a tetrarchy, instituted by Diocletian. Eventually, it was split into two halves, namely the Western and the Eastern. The Western Roman Empire fell in 476 after civic unrest, further economic decline and invasions led to the surrender of Romulus Augustus to Odoacer, a Germanic king. On the other hand, the Eastern Roman Empire survived until 1453, with the Fall of Constantinople. Its rulers' main titles in Greek were Autokrator and Basileus.
 The Eastern Han dynasty of China under Dong Zhuo.
 Tsarist and Imperial Russia under Tsar Ivan the Terrible. Shortly after being crowned as ruler, Ivan IV immediately removed his political enemies by execution or exile and established dominance over the Russian empire, expanding the borders of his kingdom dramatically. To enforce his rule, Ivan established the Streltzy as Russia's standing army and developed two cavalry divisions that were fiercely loyal to the Tsar. He also established the Cossacks and the Oprichniki. In his later years, Ivan made orders for his forces to sack the city of Novgorod in fear of being overthrown. The ideology Orthodoxy, Autocracy and Nationality was introduced by Emperor Nicholas I of Russia and would last until its fall in the Russian Revolution and the rise of Vladimir Lenin.
 The Tokugawa shogunate, a period of Japanese history which followed a series of conflicts between warring clans, states, and rulers. Tokugawa Ieyasu seized control of all of Japan through a mix of superior tactics and diplomacy, until he became the undisputed shogun (military ruler of Japan). The shogunate established by Tokugawa and continued by his successors controlled all aspects of life, closing the borders of Japan to all foreign nations and ruling with a policy of isolationism known as sakoku.
 Sweden during the reigns of Gustav I (1523–1560), Charles XI and Charles XII (1680–1718), and Gustav III and Gustav IV Adolf (1772–1809).
 Denmark–Norway under the House of Oldenburg.
 The French Republic and the French Empire from 1799 to 1814 under Napoleon Bonaparte.
 The Ottoman Empire from 1878 to 1908 under Abdul Hamid II.
 The Soviet Union during the tenure of Joseph Stalin in addition to other Soviet leaders. The Soviet Union was founded by Vladimir Lenin in 1922 following the Russian Civil War (1917–1922), and several of its leaders have been considered autocratic. Political repression occurred in the Soviet Union until its dissolution in 1991.
 Fascist Italy under Benito Mussolini.
 Empire of Japan under Emperor Hirohito and the Imperial Rule Assistance Association.
 Nazi Germany under Adolf Hitler.
 Francoist Spain under Francisco Franco (1939-1975).
 Indonesia under Suharto's New Order (1966–1998).
 Greece under the military junta of Georgios Papadopoulos (1967–1974).
 Brazil under Getúlio Vargas (1930-45)
 Paraguay under the government of Alfredo Stroessner.
 The People’s Republic of China under the leadership of Mao Zedong.
 Cuba under Fidel Castro.
 Haiti under François Duvalier and his son Jean-Claude Duvalier during the period of Family dynastic dictatorship in the Caribbean.
 The Republic of Zaire under the dictatorship of Mobutu Sese Seko in Africa. 
 Syria under Hafez al-Assad and his son Bashar al-Assad
 Libya under Muammar Gaddafi 
 Iran under Ruhollah Khomeini.
 North Korea has been under the Kim dynasty beginning with Kim Il-sung since 1948.
 Taiwan under Chiang Kai-Shek.
 Belarus under Alexander Lukashenko
 Egypt under Gamal Abdel Nasser, Anwar Sadat, Hosni Mubarak, and currently Abdel Fattah el-Sisi.
 Afghanistan is officially an autocracy under Hibatullah Akhundzada just as it was under Mullah Omar; the Taliban claims no limits on the powers of the supreme leader.

See also

 Absolute monarchy
 Anocracy
 Autarchism
 Authoritarianism
 Caudillo
 Centralisation
 Caesaropapism
 Despotism
 Dictatorship
 Führerprinzip
 Kleptocracy
 Monocracy
 Political polarization
 Ruscism
 Theocracy
 Triumvirate
 Tsarist autocracy
 Tyranny
 Theonomy

References

External links

 Felix Bethke: "Research on Autocratic Regimes: Divide et Impera", Katapult-Magazine (2015-03-15)

Authoritarianism
Dictatorship